The Diver class of rescue and salvage ship were operated by the United States Navy.

Ships

References